Oleksiy Volodymyrovych Kucher (born 23 March 1985) is a Ukrainian lawyer and politician. Kucher was Governor of Kharkiv Oblast from November 2019 until November 2020.

Biography 
Kucher studied at the H.S. Skovoroda Kharkiv National Pedagogical University.

He also graduated from the Yaroslav Mudryi National Law University.

He obtained his lawyer's license in 2011. Teacher at the High School of Advocacy.

Kucher was elected to the Verkhovna Rada in the 2019 Ukrainian parliamentary election. As a candidate of Servant of the People he won election district 179 (located in Kharkiv Oblast) with 50.62% of the votes; Serhii Chernov of Opposition Bloc placed second with 17.25% of the votes. In parliament he became member of the Verkhovna Rada Committee on Legal Policy.

On 11 November 2019 President Volodymyr Zelensky appointed Kucher Governor of Kharkiv Oblast.

In the October 2020 Kharkiv mayoral election Kucher was the mayoral candidate of Servant of the People. He finished third with 7.24%, losing to incumbent mayor Hennadiy Kernes.

President Zelensky dismissed Kucher, as Governor of Kharkiv Oblast, on 27 November 2020.

See also 
 List of members of the parliament of Ukraine, 2019–24

References

External links 
 
 
 

1985 births
Living people
People from Kherson Oblast
Politicians from Kharkiv
Yaroslav Mudryi National Law University alumni
21st-century Ukrainian lawyers
Ninth convocation members of the Verkhovna Rada
Governors of Kharkiv Oblast
Servant of the People (political party) politicians
21st-century Ukrainian politicians